The 2016 Lecoq Seoul Open was a professional tennis tournament played on outdoor hard courts. It was the second edition of the tournament. It was part of the 2016 ATP Challenger Tour, offering a total of $100,000 in prize money. It took place in Seoul, South Korea, on 9–15 May 2016.

Men's singles main draw entrants

Seeds 

 1 Rankings as of 2 May 2016.

Other entrants 
The following players received wildcards into the singles main draw:
  Hong Seong-chan
  Kang Ho-gi
  Kwon Soon-woo
  Nam Ji-sung

The following players received entry from the qualifying draw:
  Liam Broady
  Yuya Kibi
  Frederik Nielsen
  Alexander Ward

The following player entered as a lucky loser:
  Shuichi Sekiguchi

Champions

Singles

 Sergiy Stakhovsky def.  Lu Yen-hsun, 4–6, 6–3, 7–6(9–7)

Doubles

 Matt Reid /  John-Patrick Smith def.  Gong Maoxin /  Yi Chu-huan, 6–3, 7–5

External links 
Combined Draw

2016 ATP Challenger Tour
2016
2016 in South Korean tennis
Seoul Open Challenger